Bak Jiwon (1737–1805), styled Yeonam ('Rock of swallow'), was a philosopher and novelist in the late Joseon dynasty. He has been regarded as one of the greatest thinkers of the so-called "Practical Learning (silhak)" movement. Park Jiwon belonged to the "School of Profitable Usage and Benefiting the People" to promote the industrialization of his country and the development of trade by positively introducing western technologies to Joseon Korea. Park Jiwon proposed that Joseon import advanced technologies from the Qing dynasty, and promote mercantilism.

The scholars Bak Jega, Yu Deukgong and Yi Deokmu were influenced by Park Jiwon.

Belief 
Along with Hong Daeyong, he argued that the ground is not flat but round. He saw that the Earth could be a large circle, not a flat surface. It also claimed that the land consists of one dust and soil. He argued that the world is objectively real, from celestial bodies to all things, and that everything in the universe is created in the process of the particle of dust and movement and change. Park's claim that the Earth is a round circle was accepted as absurd.

Personal criticism 
Park Jiwon's appearance is described in Gwajeong-rok (過庭錄), written by his son, Park Jong-chae. He was tall and very big, had a long face, prominent cheekbones, and a double eyelid. The record is almost identical to the remaining portraits of Park Jiwon. Park also said that his voice was so loud that he could be heard far outside the fence even if he spoke. Although there was one portrait depicting Park Jiwon as a middle-aged man, Yeonam forced him to destroy the portrait, saying it was less than 70 percent of his original self, and he never accepted his son's plea to paint it again.

Park Jiwon was also not able to negotiate easily with others. Kim Ki-soon said, "He lacked the power to hold down smoothly because he was so graceful, and he was always too strong to have a smooth side." Park Jiwon also admitted, "It's all because of my personality that I've been through this sort of mess all my life." In fact, Park entered the government office with a sound letter and served as a minister of internal affairs and internal affairs, but was not included in key posts in the government.

Books 

 The Jehol Diary (열하일기)
  (양반전)
 Heosaengjeon (허생전)
 YeonamJip (연암집)

Popular culture
 Portrayed by Jung Yoo-seok in the 2014 tvN TV series The Three Musketeers.

References

External links 
 A harbinger of Korean literary modernism, https://www.koreatimes.co.kr/www/news/art/2011/02/135_81644.html
 Yeonam Bak Jiwon, Die Schelte des Tigers (in German)
 Yonam Bak Jiwon: a humanist who sided with the lower classes (연암 박지원: 백성의 편에서 세상을 바꾼 휴머니스트), Im Chae-yeong (임채영), Naver BookStory, March 2012,  (in Korean) {ko}.
 Yeonam Bak Jiwon Institute website (in Korean)

18th-century Korean philosophers
Korean Confucianists
1737 births
1805 deaths
People from Seoul
18th-century Korean poets
18th-century agronomists